Siuntion asemanseutu (both  Siuntio station area, also simply known as Siuntio) is a village and administrative center of the Siuntio municipality in Uusimaa, Finland. At the end of 2020, the village had 2,284 inhabitants. It is located near the Highway 51 between Helsinki and Raseborg. As its name suggests, the village has developed in the immediate vicinity of the Siuntio railway station along the Coastal Railway, from where the X and Y trains go to Helsinki.

The village mainly has small houses, but there are also a few apartment buildings in the area. Basic services are available in the area, such as S-market grocery store, restaurants and cafés, pharmacy, barbershop, kindergarten, nursing home, two primary schools, municipal library and health center.

See also
 Siuntio Church Village

References

External links
 Siuntio - Asemanseudut (in Finnish)
 Siuntio Station Area's location at Fonecta

Siuntio
Villages in Finland